Kiara Fontanesi (born 10 March 1994) is an Italian professional motocross racer. She has competed in the Motocross World Championships since 2011. Fontanesi is notable for being six-time FIM women's motocross world champion.

Biography
Since 2016 she is an athlete of the Gruppo Sportivo Fiamme Oro (Fiamme Oro Sports Group).

Personal life
In 2015 she has a relationship with the Spanish MotoGP rider Maverick Vinales, since 2017 she is engaged to the former MotoGP rider Aprilia, the British Scott Redding. Currently she is in a relationship with the boxer Devin Parenti.

References

External links
 
 Kiara Fontanesi at Monster Energy web site

1994 births
Living people
Italian motocross riders
Female motorcycle racers
Motorcycle racers of Fiamme Oro
Italian sportswomen